The Moldova national beach soccer team represents Moldova in international beach soccer competitions and is controlled by the Federaţia Moldovenească de Fotbal, the governing body for football in Moldova.

Current squad
Correct as of July 2012

Coach : Gosperschi

External links
 Team Profile on Beach Soccer Russia
Team profile at Beach Soccer Worldwide

European national beach soccer teams
Beach soccer in Moldova
beach soccer